Yucca filamentosa, Adam’s needle and thread, is a species of flowering plant in the family Asparagaceae native to the southeastern United States.

Description

Y. filamentosa is readily distinguished from other yucca species by white, thready filaments along the leaf margins.

Taxonomy
Y. filamentosa is closely related to Y. flaccida and it is possible they should be classified as a single species.

Names
Its common names include Adam's needle, common yucca, Spanish bayonet, bear-grass, needle-palm, silk-grass, and spoon-leaf yucca.

Distribution and habitat
The species is found from southeast Virginia south to Florida, and as far west as south and southeast Texas. It has become naturalized along the Atlantic coastal plain north to Cape Cod and Long Island Sound, and into areas of the lower Midwest. It is reportedly also naturalized in France, Italy and Turkey.

This plant is most commonly found in sandy soils, especially in beach scrub and dunes, but also in fields, barrens, and rocky slopes, though it grows well also in silt or clay soils.

Ecology
The plants are pollinated by the yucca moth Tegeticula yuccasella. Other moth species, such as Tegeticula intermedia, also use this yucca as a host plant to lay their eggs.

Cultivation
Y. filamentosa is widely cultivated in mild temperate and subtropical climates. A fairly compact species, it nevertheless presents a striking appearance with its sword-like leaves and dramatic flowerheads. It is naturally a focal point in the landscape, also providing a tropical touch in temperate gardens. It needs full sun and a well-drained soil, preferring an acid or slightly alkaline pH range of 5.5 to 7.5. It develops a large, fleshy, white taproot with deep lateral roots. Once planted and established, it is difficult to remove, as the roots keep sending up new shoots for many years.

Cultivars
'Bright Edge', a dwarf cultivar with yellow-margined foliage and creamy flowers tinged with green, has gained the Royal Horticultural Society's Award of Garden Merit. ‘Color Guard’, with broad yellow  stripes all year plus red stripes in the winter, has also won the award. 

Other cultivars include:
 'Golden Sword' - with yellow centered leaves and green margins.
 'Ivory Tower' - with larger, branched inflorescence.

Uses
Once the seeds have been removed, the fruits can be cooked and eaten. The large flower petals can also be eaten in salads.

The leaves, stems and roots of this plant can be used to stun fish. The Cherokee used it for this purpose.

References

External links

filamentosa
Flora of the Great Lakes region (North America)
Flora of the Northeastern United States
Flora of the Southeastern United States
Flora of the United States
Least concern flora of the United States
Medicinal plants of North America
Plants described in 1753
Taxa named by Carl Linnaeus